Bari Light, also known as Punta San Cataldo di Bari Lighthouse is an active lighthouse  placed at the base of  Molo San Cataldo, on the west side of the harbour of Bari on the Adriatic Sea, in the southern region of Apulia, Italy.

Description
It is the 24th tallest "traditional lighthouse" in the world. The tower, characterized by six windows aligned on the seaward side, is painted white and the lantern dome in grey metallic.

The lighthouse is completely automated and managed by the Marina Militare with the identification code number 3706 E.F.

See also
 List of tallest lighthouses in the world
 List of lighthouses in Italy

References

External links
 Servizio Fari Marina Militare 

Lighthouses completed in 1869
Lighthouses in Italy
Buildings and structures in Bari
1869 establishments in Italy